Caroline Pettinato Killeen (1926 – December 2014) was an American activist, perennial political candidate, self-proclaimed nature lobbyist, and former nun.  She ran as a United States presidential candidate and officially qualified for the ballot in the New Hampshire primary in 2008 as a Democrat; she previously ran in 2004, 1996, 1992 and 1976. She ran on a pro-marijuana platform and is an advocate for energy conservation.
Killeen has also run for various offices in Arizona. She ran for Mayor of Tucson in 1983, receiving 11 votes.

Killeen has biked across the U.S. several times to raise awareness of environmental  and anti-nuclear issues. In 1987, at the age of 61, she rode a bicycle across America to protest against the arms race between the Soviet Union and United States. She has also advocated
drug legalization.

References

External links
 

1926 births
2014 deaths
American anti–nuclear power activists
American cannabis activists
American environmentalists
American women environmentalists
20th-century American Roman Catholic nuns
Female candidates for President of the United States
New Hampshire Democrats
Candidates in the 1976 United States presidential election
Candidates in the 1992 United States presidential election
Candidates in the 1996 United States presidential election
20th-century American politicians
Candidates in the 2004 United States presidential election
Candidates in the 2008 United States presidential election
21st-century American politicians
Women in New Hampshire politics
21st-century American women politicians
20th-century American women politicians